Raoul Thiercelin (12 March 1898 – 1 May 1988) was a French rugby union player. He was part of the French team that won the silver medal in the rugby tournament at the 1920 Summer Olympics.

See also
 List of Olympic medalists in rugby

References

External links
 

1898 births
1988 deaths
French rugby union players
Rugby union players at the 1920 Summer Olympics
Olympic rugby union players of France
Medalists at the 1920 Summer Olympics
Olympic silver medalists for France
Place of birth missing